Patrola Šlapeto is a band of Czech folk and cabaret music formed in 2005 by Radan Dolejš (a long-time leader of the former band  Šlapeto, active since 1989) and Karel Hoza (a long-time leader of the band "Pražský pouťový a promenádní orchestr").

It was set up as a "Šlapeto Revival Band" of the same style of Czech pub and music hall/cabaret songs known as the "Old Prague songs" (staropražské písničky) epitomized by  Karel Hašler.

The lineup of both bands varied over time.

The band Šlapeto (1989-2005) was established by Radan Dolejš (guitar), Jiří Pánek (double bass) and Ivo Zelenka (accordion), soon expanded with other members.<ref>"ŠLAPETO aneb se stáropražskými písničkami do světa", Czech Dialogue, October 2001 (retrieved January 21, 2014)</ref>

Around 2000 Dolejš parted with Šlapeto. In an interview he explained the decision that whey played only old songs, and there are only so many of them, especially good ones, not enough to produce albums every year.. After some time together with Robert Papoušek he created the band Patrola. The success of the album dedicated to the 125th anniversary of Karel Hašler allowed the two bands to continue,  by joining the forces.

The band Šlapeto was three times recipient of the Annual Czechoslovak music awards (now Anděl Awards) in  1996 (Česká Gramy), 1997 (Výroční hudební cena) and 1998 (Akademie populární hudby) in the category of folk and wind music. It also issued 4 golden records.

Discography
2013: Praha srdce Evropy ("Prague, the Heart of the Europe") 1 CD + 1 DVD.  A collection of the songs by Karel Hašler based on the original recordings found in mucical archives.
2009: Ručičky nebojte se''  ("Hands, Don't be Afraid"), 1 cd+1dvd, Best of Patrola Šlapeto.
Máš-li kapičku štěstí... Robert Papoušek a Patrola 2001
Zpráva o stavu pražských hospod 2003 
Robert Papoušek & Patrola - Všechny naše holky 
Karel Hašler - 125 (CD1) 
Karel Hašler - 125 (CD2) 
Patrola - Máme v kleci papouška 
Četnické mini CD Patrola/Šlapeto
Ta naše písnička česká (CD1) Patrola Šlapeto
Ta naše písnička česká (CD2) Patrola Šlapeto
minialbum Hašlerky 2010 Patrola Šlapeto
Český rozhlas Silvestr 2010 "Patrola Šlapeto živě"
2010" "Živě v "Semaforu", DVD

References

Czech folk music groups
2005 establishments in the Czech Republic
Musical groups established in 2005